Muntadhar al-Zaidi ( Muntaẓar az-Zaydī; born 15 January 1979) is an Iraqi broadcast journalist who served as a correspondent for Iraqi-owned, Egyptian-based Al-Baghdadia TV.  , al-Zaidi works with a Lebanese TV channel.

On 16 November 2007, al-Zaidi was kidnapped by unknown assailants in Baghdad. He was also previously twice arrested by the United States Armed Forces. On 14 December 2008, al-Zaidi  threw his shoes at then-U.S. President George W. Bush during a Baghdad press conference while shouting, "This is a farewell kiss from the Iraqi people, you dog." Al-Zaidi suffered injuries as he was taken into custody and some sources said he was tortured during his initial detention. There were calls throughout the Middle East to place the shoes in an Iraqi museum, but the shoes were later destroyed by U.S. and Iraqi security forces.
Al-Zaidi's shoeing inspired many similar incidents of political protest around the world.

Following the incident, Al-Zaidi was represented by the head of the Iraqi Bar Association at trial. On 20 February 2009, al-Zaidi received a 90-minute trial by the Central Criminal Court of Iraq. On 12 March 2009, he was sentenced to three years in prison for assaulting a foreign head of state during an official visit. On 7 April, the sentence was reduced from three years to one year. He was released on 15 September 2009 for good behavior after spending nine months in jail. After his release, Al-Zaidi was treated for injuries received in prison and later said he planned to "build orphanages, a children's hospital, and medical and orthopaedic centres offering free treatment and manned by Iraqi doctors and medical staff."

Biography

Muntadhar al-Zaidi was raised in Sadr City, a suburb of Baghdad, Iraq.  He began working as a correspondent for Al-Baghdadia TV in 2005. He first became known as a victim of a kidnapping  by unknown assailants in November 2007. Al-Zaidi has also been arrested twice by the United States Armed Forces.  He lives in a two-room apartment within central Baghdad. He is of the Shia Muslim faith and also is of Sayyid descent.

Ahmed Alaa, a close friend and colleague of al-Zaidi at al-Baghdadia television (barred in Iraq 2014), in a talk on Islam Online, refers to "One of [al-Zaidi's] best reports" "on Zahra, a young Iraqi school girl killed by the occupation forces while en route to school." Alaa said al-Zaidi documented the tragedy in his reportage, complete with interviews with her family, neighbors and friends. "This report earned him the respect of many Iraqis and won him many hearts in Iraq," he said. Al-Zaidi once also turned down an offer to work for what he termed "a pro-occupation channel". Friends said al-Zaidi had been "emotionally influenced" by the destruction he'd seen in his coverage of the US bombing of Sadr City. On politics, al-Zaidi said "I’m Iraqi and I’m proud of my country." Friends of al-Zaidi said he utterly rejected the occupation and the civil clashes. They said he believed the U.S.-Iraq Status of Forces Agreement was a "legalization of the occupation."

Sami Ramadani, a political exile from Saddam's regime and a senior lecturer at London Metropolitan University, wrote in an op-ed for The Guardian that al-Zaidi "reported for al-Baghdadia on the poor and downtrodden victims of the US war. He was first on the scene in Sadr City and wherever people suffered violence or severe deprivation. He not only followed US Apache helicopters' trails of death and destruction, but he was also among the first to report every 'sectarian' atrocity and the bombing of popular market places. He let the victims talk first".

Kidnapping and detention
On Friday morning, 16 November 2007, al-Zaidi was kidnapped on his way to work in central Baghdad.  Unknown armed men forced him into a car, where he was beaten until he lost consciousness.  The assailants used al-Zaidi's necktie to blindfold him and bound his hands with shoelaces.  He was held captive with little food and drink and questioned about his work as a journalist.  During his disappearance, al-Zaidi was reported missing by Iraq's Journalistic Freedoms Observatory. On 18 November, Reporters Without Borders "voiced deep concern" in a statement about al-Zaidi's detention. No ransom demand was made, and al-Zaidi's kidnappers released him still blindfolded, on to a street three days later around 3 a.m. on Monday, 19 November 2007, after which al-Zaidi's brother picked him up.  The United Nations High Commissioner for Refugees mentioned al-Zaidi's kidnapping in a December 2007 report that listed violent incidents in the media, in particular, incidents targeting journalists in Baghdad.  According to the report,
"journalists and media workers and other professionals continue to be targets for kidnapping and assassination."

After his kidnapping, al-Zaidi told Reuters; "My release is a miracle. I couldn't believe I was still alive."  The editor of Al-Baghdadia TV described the kidnapping as an "act of gangs, because all of Muntadhar's reports are moderate and unbiased." Al-Zaidi has also been arrested twice by the United States armed forces in Iraq.  In January 2008, al-Zaidi was detained overnight by US troops as they searched his residence.  The soldiers later offered him an apology.

George W. Bush shoeing

During a 14 December 2008 press conference at the prime minister's palace in Baghdad, Iraq, al-Zaidi threw both of his shoes at then-United States president George W. Bush.  "This is a farewell kiss from the Iraqi people, you dog," yelled al-Zaidi in Arabic as he threw his first shoe towards Bush.  "This is for the widows and orphans and all those killed in Iraq," he shouted as he threw his second shoe. Bush ducked twice to avoid being hit by the shoes. Prime Minister Nuri al-Maliki attempted to catch one of the shoes to protect Bush. Al-Zaidi was pulled to the floor before being grabbed by the prime minister's guards, kicked, and rushed out of the room.

Al-Zaidi was initially held by the prime minister's guards and was later turned over to the Iraqi army's Baghdad command. The command handed him over to the Iraqi judiciary. Hundreds took to the streets to demand his release. Al-Zaidi could have faced charges of insulting a foreign leader and the Iraqi prime minister. A conviction of these charges could have carried a sentence of up to two years in prison or a small fine, although it would have been unlikely to face the maximum penalty given his newfound "cult status" in the Arab world, according to a Middle-East observer. An Iraqi lawyer stated that al-Zaidi was likely to get at least two years in prison if he was prosecuted. Al-Zaidi went before a judge on 17 December. He declined to be represented by Khalil al-Duleimi, who defended the late Iraqi leader Saddam Hussein before his execution, and also said he wanted to be represented by an Iraqi lawyer. "I will introduce myself as his lawyer and demand the case be closed and Muntader be released because he did not commit a crime," said Dheyaa al-Saadi, al-Zaidi's lawyer and head of the Iraqi Bar Association. "He only freely expressed himself to the occupier, and he has such a right according to international law." On the same day, al-Zaidi appeared privately before a judge from within the Green Zone. He was released from jail on 15 September 2009, after serving nine months in prison. He vowed to release the names of those who he said tortured him, including senior officials in the government and the army.

Al-Zaidi humanitarian foundation
Following his release, al-Zaidi went to Geneva and announced that he had started creating a humanitarian agency/foundation. The aim of the agency would be to "build orphanages, a children's hospital, and medical and orthopaedic centres offering free treatment and manned by Iraqi doctors and medical staff." His lawyer said that al-Zaidi "hopes to surf on the wave of support he has gained to do some good."

2018 Iraqi election
Al-Zaidi announced in early 2018 his intent to run for the Iraqi Council of Representatives on Muqtada al-Sadr's Alliance towards Reforms ticket. In an interview with Reuters he stated that "The main real purpose and reason behind my nomination is to get rid of the corrupt, and to expel them from our country". Zaidi has been critical of US and Iranian involvement in Iraq during his campaigning expressing a view that "America and Iran are the reasons for the tension in Iraq". During his campaign al-Zaidi sought to criticise US involvement in terms of Iraq's security forces, arguing that; "We have American troops under the name of 'consultants' – we don’t accept their presence in Iraq".

Publications 
 The Last Salute to President Bush, 2010

See also

 Casualties of the Iraq War
 Shoeing
 U.S.-Iraq Status of Forces Agreement

Notes

a.  Alternative transliterations used in Western media: Muthathar, Muntadhar, Muntadar, Muntazer, Muthathi; al-Zeidi also transliterated as "Zeidi" is an Arabic name, meaning abundance or growth or "one who progresses and makes other people progress."

References

External links

 
 Shoe Thrower Jailed for Attack on Bush by Tim Albone, The National, 13 March 2009
 Shoe-thrower Journalist, A Hero to Many

1979 births
Living people
Anti-Americanism
Iraq–United States relations
Iraqi anti-war activists
Iraqi journalists
Iraqi Shia Muslims
Iraqi torture victims
People from Baghdad
Protests against the Iraq War
Iraqi television journalists
University of Baghdad alumni
Articles containing video clips